An Egyptian medical student, Khaled Abu al-Dahab (Abul-Dahab) was arrested and convicted of terrorism. He is alleged to have been a right-hand man to Ali Mohamed, who had been an American Special Forces soldier.

Ali Mohamed travelled north from California with al-Dahab, who later told Egyptian interrogators he had withdrawn US$3,000 from a Californian bank account on orders of Osama bin Laden himself, to offer as bail money to lawyer Phil Rankin. The pair hoped to have Essam Marzouk released and possibly smuggle him into the United States.

In 2002, Abul-Dahab confessed to Egyptian interrogators that he had funded the 1995 attack on the Egyptian Embassy in Pakistan on orders from bin Laden, and had transferred money from a Californian bank account to Pakistan to finance the attack.

References

External links
Susan Sachs and John Kifnera  A Nation Challenged: Bin Laden's Lieutenant; Egyptian Raised Terror Funds in U.S. in 1990's, New York Times,  October 23, 2001.
Lance Williams. Bin Laden's Bay Area recruiter Khalid Abu-al-Dahab signed up American Muslims to be terrorists, San Francisco Chronicle, November 21, 2001.

Year of birth missing (living people)
Living people
Egyptian al-Qaeda members